The word Uralic refers to the Uralic languages and their speakers. It is named for the Ural region of Russia. See also:
 Eskimo–Uralic languages
 Indo-Uralic languages
 Proto-Uralic homeland hypotheses
 Proto-Uralic language
 Uralic neopaganism
 Uralic Phonetic Alphabet
 Uralic–Yukaghir languages
 Uralo-Siberian languages

See also